Gerald Rudolff Ford (December 9, 1890 – January 26, 1962) was an American businessman and Republican politician who was the stepfather of U.S. President Gerald Ford and for whom Ford legally changed his name.

Early life
Ford was born in Grand Rapids, Michigan, where he raised the future President. His parents were George R. and Frances (Pixley) Ford.

The senior Ford's father George Ford died in a train accident in 1903 forcing him to drop out of school to support the family.  He was working as a paint salesman at the Grand Rapids Wood Finishing Company when he met the future president's mother Dorothy Ayer Gardner King. Dorothy had fled to Michigan from Omaha, Nebraska, in 1913, 16 days after the President's birth, claiming that her husband (and her son's birth father), Leslie Lynch King Sr., had physically abused her. She came to Grand Rapids to be near her parents, Levi Addison Gardner and Adele Augusta Ayer Gardner, who lived in the town.

Family
The couple married on February 1, 1917, following Dorothy's divorce from King when the future president was three and began calling Dorothy's first son "Gerald."

Gerald Rudolff Ford and Dorothy Ford had three children – sons Thomas Gardner Ford (July 15, 1918 – August 28, 1995); Richard Addison Ford (June 3, 1924 – March 20, 2015); and James Francis Ford (August 11, 1927 – January 23, 2001).

The president was to write later that in the household there were three rules for him and his half brothers: "tell the truth, work hard and come to dinner on time."

The elder Ford founded the Ford Paint and Varnish Company in 1929 just before the Great Depression. After the Depression hit, Ford asked his employees to work for $5/week and likewise paid himself the same salary until all could be paid more.

The future president was enrolled in the Grand Rapids school system under the name of his stepfather.   When the president's birth father Leslie Lynch King reappeared in 1929 (or 1930 depending on accounts), he stopped at schools searching for a "Leslie King" before finding him at Grand Rapids South High School after asking for a "Junior Ford."

The future president turned down an offer from his biological father to move with him to Wyoming.

Leslie's father Charles King had been paying child support for Ford until 1929 when the stock market crash wiped out his fortune. After Leslie's father died, Dorothy sought an order to get money from the $50,000 Leslie had inherited. However, since Leslie had moved to Wyoming he was out of the jurisdiction of the Nebraska court.

The elder Ford never legally adopted the president. The president changed his name in 1935 after the deaths of his paternal King family grandparents to an Anglicized version of his stepfather's name: Gerald Rudolph Ford.

Early career
The elder Ford was active on various functions including the formation of the Youth Commonwealth to help disadvantaged youth. He was director of the Grand Rapids Chamber of Commerce and chairman of the Kent County, Michigan Republican Committee from 1944 until 1948 when he stepped down after the future President began his first run for Congress.

The elder Ford was active with his four sons in the Boy Scouts of America. The future President would be the first Eagle Scout to become Vice President or President. The President was to say later that the award was one of his proudest accomplishments.

The President was to write later:

He was the father that I grew up to believe was my father, the father I loved and learned from and respected. He was my dad... Dad was one of the truly outstanding people I ever knew in my life.

Death
The elder Ford died on January 26, 1962, in Grand Rapids, Michigan. He and his wife are buried in Woodlawn Cemetery in Grand Rapids.

References

1890 births
1962 deaths
Politicians from Grand Rapids, Michigan
Gerald Ford family
Michigan Republicans
Burials in Michigan
20th-century American politicians
Businesspeople from Grand Rapids, Michigan
20th-century American businesspeople